Optimal solutions for Rubik's Cube refer to solutions that are the shortest. There are two common ways to measure the length of a solution.  The first is to count the number of quarter turns. The second is to count the number of outer-layer twists, called "face turns". A move to turn an outer layer two quarter (90°) turns in the same direction would be counted as two moves in the quarter turn metric (QTM), but as one turn in the face metric (FTM, or HTM "Half Turn Metric", or OBTM "Outer Block Turn Metric").

The maximal number of face turns needed to solve any instance of the Rubik's Cube is 20, and the maximal number of quarter turns is 26. These numbers are also the diameters of the corresponding  Cayley graphs of the Rubik's Cube group. In STM (slice turn metric), the minimal number of turns is unknown.

There are many algorithms to solve scrambled Rubik's Cubes. An algorithm that solves a cube in the minimum number of moves is known as God's algorithm.

Move notation 

To denote a sequence of moves on the 3×3×3 Rubik's Cube, this article uses "Singmaster notation", which was developed by David Singmaster. 

The letters L, R, F, B, U, and D indicate a clockwise quarter turn of the left, right, front, back, up, and down face respectively. Half turns are indicated by appending a 2. A counterclockwise quarter turn is indicated by appending a prime symbol ( ′ ).

The letters M, S and E are used to denote the turning of a middle layer. M represents turning the layer between the R and L faces 1 quarter turn top to bottom. S represents turning the layer between the F and B faces 1 quarter turn clockwise, as seen from the front. E represents turning the layer between the U and D faces 1 quarter turn left to right, clockwise as seen from the bottom. As with regular turns, a 2 signifies a double turn and a prime (') indicates a quarter turn anticlockwise.

The letters X, Y and Z are used to signify cube rotations. X signifies rotating the cube in the R direction. Y signifies the rotation of the cube in the U direction. Z signifies the rotation of the cube on the F direction . These cube rotations are used in algorithms to make the algorithms smoother and faster. As with regular turns, a 2 signifies a half rotation and a prime (') indicates a quarter rotation in the opposite direction. Note that these letters are usually lowercase instead.

Lower bounds

It can be proven by counting arguments that there exist positions needing at least 18 moves to solve. To show this, first count the number of cube positions that exist in total, then count the number of positions achievable using at most 17 moves starting from a solved cube. It turns out that the latter number is smaller. 

This argument was not improved upon for many years. Also, it is not a constructive proof: it does not exhibit a concrete position that needs this many moves. It was conjectured that the so-called superflip would be a position that is very difficult.  A Rubik's Cube is in the superflip pattern when each corner piece is in the correct position, but each edge piece is incorrectly oriented. In 1992, a solution for the superflip with 20 face turns was found by Dik T. Winter, of which the minimality was shown in 1995 by Michael Reid, providing a new lower bound for the diameter of the cube group. Also in 1995, a solution for superflip in 24 quarter turns was found by Michael Reid, with its minimality proven by Jerry Bryan. In 1998, a new position requiring more than 24 quarter turns to solve was found. The position, which was called a 'superflip composed with four spot' needs 26 quarter turns.

Upper bounds

The first upper bounds were based on the 'human' algorithms. By combining the worst-case scenarios for each part of these algorithms, the typical upper bound was found to be around 100.

Perhaps the first concrete value for an upper bound was the 277 moves mentioned by David Singmaster in early 1979. He simply counted the maximum number of moves required by his cube-solving algorithm. Later, Singmaster reported that Elwyn Berlekamp, John Conway, and Richard K. Guy had come up with a different algorithm that took at most 160 moves. Soon after, Conway’s Cambridge Cubists reported that the cube could be restored in at most 94 moves.

Thistlethwaite's algorithm
The breakthrough, known as "descent through nested sub-groups" was found by Morwen Thistlethwaite; details of Thistlethwaite's algorithm were published in Scientific American in 1981 by Douglas Hofstadter. The approaches to the cube that led to algorithms with very few moves are based on group theory and on extensive computer searches. Thistlethwaite's idea was to divide the problem into subproblems. Where algorithms up to that point divided the problem by looking at the parts of the cube that should remain fixed, he divided it by restricting the type of moves that could be executed. In particular he divided the cube group into the following chain of subgroups:

Next he prepared tables for each of the right coset spaces . For each element he found a sequence of moves that took it to the next smaller group. After these preparations he worked as follows. A random cube is in the general cube group . Next he found this element in the right coset space . He applied the corresponding process to the cube.

The coset space  is the largest and contains only 1082565 elements. The number of moves required by this algorithm is the sum of the largest process in each step.

Initially, Thistlethwaite showed that any configuration could be solved in at most 85 moves. In January 1980 he improved his strategy to yield a maximum of 80 moves. Later that same year, he reduced the number to 63, and then again to 52. By exhaustively searching the coset spaces it was later found that the worst possible number of moves for each stage was 7, 10, 13, and 15 giving a total of 45 moves at most. There have been implementations of Thistlewaite's algorithm in various computer languages.

Kociemba's algorithm
Thistlethwaite's algorithm was improved by Herbert Kociemba in 1992. He reduced the number of intermediate groups to only two:

As with Thistlethwaite's algorithm, he would search through the right coset space  to take the cube to group . Next he searched the optimal solution for group . Using this algorithm solutions are typically found of fewer than 21 moves, though there is no proof that it will always do so.

In 1995 Michael Reid proved that using these two groups every position can be solved in at most 29 face turns, or in 42 quarter turns. This result was improved by Silviu Radu in 2005 to 40.

At first glance, this algorithm appears to be practically inefficient: if contains 18 possible moves (each move, its prime, and its 180-degree rotation), that leaves  (over 1 quadrillion) cube states to be searched. Even with a heuristic-based computer algorithm like IDA*, which may narrow it down considerably, searching through that many states is likely not practical. When the exact number of moves needed to reach is available, the search becomes virtually instantaneous: one need only generate 18 cube states for each of the 12 moves and choose the one with the lowest heuristic each time.

Korf's algorithm
Using these group solutions combined with computer searches will generally quickly give very short solutions. But these solutions do not always come with a guarantee of their minimality. To search specifically for minimal solutions a new approach was needed.

In 1997 Richard Korf announced an algorithm with which he had optimally solved random instances of the cube. Of the ten random cubes he did, none required more than 18 face turns. The method he used is called IDA* and is described in his paper "Finding Optimal Solutions to Rubik's Cube Using Pattern Databases". Korf describes this method as follows
 IDA* is a depth-first search that looks for increasingly longer solutions in a series of iterations, using a lower-bound heuristic to prune branches once a lower bound on their length exceeds the current iterations bound.

It works roughly as follows. First he identified a number of subproblems that are small enough to be solved optimally. He used:

The cube restricted to only the corners, not looking at the edges
The cube restricted to only 6 edges, not looking at the corners nor at the other edges.
The cube restricted to the other 6 edges.

Clearly the number of moves required to solve any of these subproblems is a lower bound for the number of moves needed to solve the entire cube.

Given a random cube C, it is solved as iterative deepening. First all cubes are generated that are the result of applying 1 move to them. That is C * F, C * U, … Next, from this list, all cubes are generated that are the result of applying two moves. Then three moves and so on. If at any point a cube is found that needs too many moves based on the lower bounds to still be optimal it can be eliminated from the list.

Although this algorithm will always find optimal solutions, there is no worst case analysis. It is not known how many moves this algorithm might need. An implementation of this algorithm can be found here.

Further improvements, and finding God's Number
In 2006, Silviu Radu further improved his methods to prove that every position can be solved in at most 27 face turns or 35 quarter turns. Daniel Kunkle and Gene Cooperman in 2007 used a supercomputer to show that all unsolved cubes can be solved in no more than 26 moves (in face-turn metric). Instead of attempting to solve each of the billions of variations explicitly, the computer was programmed to bring the cube to one of 15,752 states, each of which could be solved within a few extra moves. All were proved solvable in 29 moves, with most solvable in 26. Those that could not initially be solved in 26 moves were then solved explicitly, and shown that they too could be solved in 26 moves.

Tomas Rokicki reported in a 2008 computational proof that all unsolved cubes could be solved in 25 moves or fewer. This was later reduced to 23 moves. In August 2008 Rokicki announced that he had a proof for 22 moves.

Finally, in 2010, Tomas Rokicki, Herbert Kociemba, Morley Davidson, and John Dethridge gave the final computer-assisted proof that all cube positions could be solved with a maximum of 20 face turns.
In 2009, Tomas Rokicki proved that 29 moves in the quarter-turn metric is enough to solve any scrambled cube. And in 2014, Tomas Rokicki and Morley Davidson proved that the maximum number of quarter-turns needed to solve the cube is 26.

The face-turn and quarter-turn metrics differ in the nature of their antipodes.
An antipode is a scrambled cube that is maximally far from solved, one that requires the maximum number of moves to solve. In the half-turn metric with a maximum number of 20, there are hundreds of millions of such positions. In the quarter-turn metric, only a single position (and its two rotations) is known that requires the maximum of 26 moves. Despite significant effort, no additional quarter-turn distance-26 positions have been found. Even at distance 25, only two positions (and their rotations) are known to exist. At distance 24, perhaps 150,000 positions exist.

References

Further reading

External links

 How to solve the Rubik's Cube, a Wikibooks article that gives an overview over several algorithms that are simple enough to be memorizable by humans. However, such algorithms will usually not give an optimal solution which only uses the minimum possible number of moves.

Rubik's Cube
Computer-assisted proofs